Enveri (d. 1512?) was a 15th-century Ottoman poet and historian. He wrote a famous Ottoman history in the Ottoman Turkish language named Dusturname, the Constitutional Book (for Ottoman History). His work consists of 3730 verses and is based on three parts: the first is a universal Islamic history, the second, which he is famous for, about the Aydinids, and the third (842 verses) about the Ottomans. Not much is known about his personal life.

References

Year of birth missing
1512 deaths
15th-century historians from the Ottoman Empire
15th-century writers from the Ottoman Empire
Historians of the medieval Islamic world